Amin Asikainen (born 21 January 1976) is a Finnish former professional boxer who competed from 2001 to 2011, and in 2016. He held the European and European Union middleweight titles between 2006 and 2007, and the Finnish middleweight title in 2003. His nickname of "Idi" refers to the similarity of his first name to that of Idi Amin.

Early life
Amin was born in 1976 to a Moroccan father and a Finnish mother. At the age of six, he started playing football and training karate and taekwondo when he was around age of nine, but abandoned the sports in favor of boxing when he was twelve. A childhood friend of his, Joni Turunen, also became a successful amateur boxer.

Amateur boxing
Asikainen has fought a total of 175 amateur matches, winning 135 of them. He was the Finnish champion in 1996, 1998 and 1999, and also won in Tammer-, GeeBee-, Copenhagen Box Open- and Karl Leman tournaments.

Professional career
Asikainen won his first professional title in 2003, beating Kai Kauramaki to win the Finnish middleweight title.

Asikainen later won the EBU-EU middleweight championship on 5 May 2006 after beating the Frenchman Christophe Tendil by a knockout in the fifth round. After beating Sebastian Sylvester, a German, on 3 June 2006, Asikainen became the EBU Middleweight Champion.

Asikainen defended the title twice, first against Alexander Sipos on 6 October 2006, and then against Lorenzo Di Giacomo on 30 January 2007.

Sylvester regained the European middleweight title with TKO-victory in June 2007 in Zwickau, Germany.

In March 2007, Asikainen had been contracted to fight a rematch against Germany's Sebastian Sylvester for the European title, however, Asikainen pulled out due to injury and Sylvester faced Italian Alessio Furlan instead. The rematch between Asikainen and Sylvester took place in June 2007. Sylvester knocked Asikainen down twice in the eleventh round before the fight was stopped by the referee.

In 2011 in Helsinki Amin Asikainen lost to Piotr Wilczewski by TKO in the eleventh round, retiring from the sport soon after.

On 22 April 2016, 40 years old Asikainen returned to the ring for a single match beating Ivan Jukic with points.

Professional boxing record

Other
Asikainen is featured in the 2009 sports game Fight Night Round 4.

References

External links

1976 births
Living people
People from Kirkkonummi
Finnish people of Moroccan descent
Finnish male boxers
European Boxing Union champions
Middleweight boxers
Super-middleweight boxers
Sportspeople from Uusimaa